St. John's keelback (Fowlea sanctijohannis) is a species of snake in the subfamily Natricinae of the family Colubridae. The species is endemic to Asia.

Etymology
The specific name, sanctijohannis, is in honor of British naturalist Oliver Beauchamp Coventry St. John.

Geographic range
F. sanctijohannis is found in Bhutan, northern India (Himachal Pradesh, Jammu and Kashmir), northern Myanmar, Nepal, and Pakistan.

Reproduction
F. sanctijohannis is oviparous.

References

Further reading
Boulenger GA (1890). The Fauna of British India, Including Ceylon and Burma. Reptilia and Batrachia. London: Secretary of State for India in Council. (Taylor and Francis, printers). xviii + 541 pp. ("Tropidonotus sancti-johannis ", new species, p. 350).
Boulenger GA (1893). Catalogue of the Snakes in the British Museum (Natural History). Volume I., Containing the Families ... Colubridæ Aglyphæ, part. London: Trustees of the British Museum (Natural History). (Taylor and Francis, printers). xiii + 448 pp. + Plates I-XXVIII. (Tropidonotus sancti-johannis, p. 230 + Plate XV, figure 1).
Das I (2002). A Photographic Guide to Snakes and other Reptiles of India. Sanibel Island, Florida: Ralph Curtis Books. 144 pp. . (Xenochrophis sanctijohannis, p. 48).
Purkayastha J, Kalita J, Brahma RK, Doley R, Das M (2018). "A review of the relationships of Xenochrophis cerasogaster Cantor, 1839 (Serpentes: Colubridae) to its congeners". Zootaxa 4514 (1): 126–136. (Fowlea sanctijohannis, new combination).
Whitaker R, Captain A (2007). Snakes of India: The Field Guide. Chennai: Draco Books. 495 pp. .

Fowlea
Reptiles described in 1890
Reptiles of India
Reptiles of Bhutan
Reptiles of Myanmar
Reptiles of Nepal
Reptiles of Pakistan
Taxa named by George Albert Boulenger